Kaesong is a special city in the southern part of North Korea (formerly in North Hwanghae Province), and the capital of Korea during the Taebong kingdom and subsequent Goryeo dynasty. The city is near the Kaesong Industrial Region close to the border with South Korea and contains the remains of the Manwoldae palace. Called Songdo while it was the ancient capital of Goryeo, the city prospered as a trade centre that produced Korean ginseng. Kaesong now functions as North Korea's light industry centre.

During the Japanese occupation from 1910 to 1945, the city was known by the Japanese pronunciation of its name, "Kaijō". Between 1945 and 1950, Kaesong was part of South Korea and under its control. The 1953 Korean Armistice Agreement left the city under North Korean control. Due to the city's proximity to the border with South Korea, Kaesong has hosted cross-border economic exchanges between the two countries as well as the jointly run Kaesong Industrial Region.

As of 2009, the city had a population of 192,578.

History
The earliest archaeological signs of habitation in the Kaesong area date from the Neolithic. Artifacts such as Jeulmun pottery, stone ware, and stone axes have been excavated from Osongsan and Kaesong Nasong, the double-walled fortress of Kaesong. As Kaesong has been occupied by various states throughout centuries, its name has changed. It was in the realm of Mahan confederacy, and was referred to as Busogap during the rule of Goguryeo. Before the strength of Baekje was retreated to the southwest of Jungnyeong, Mungyeong Saejae, and Asan Bay in 475, the area had been a part of Baekje for about 100 years.

However, it became a territory of Silla in 555, the 16th year of Jinheung of Silla's reign, and its name was changed to Song'ak-gun during the period. According to the Samguk Sagi, when a castle was built in the site in 694, the third year of Hyoso of Silla's reign, Kaesong was referred to as "Song'ak (송악; 松嶽)". Therefore, it is assumed that the name Song'ak had been used at least before the time.

Goryeo
Silla began to decline in late 9th century, and a period of rival warlords ensued. In 898, Kaesong fell under the hand of Gung Ye, the founder of his short-lived state, Taebong, and then became a part of Goryeo in 919 by its founder, Wang Geon, who was enthroned as Taejo of Goryeo. Taejo established the capital in the south of Song'ak, and incorporated Kaesong into Song'ak under the name of "Gaeju". In 919, Kaesong became the national capital. In 960, the 11th year of Gwangjong of Goryeo's reign, the city was renamed Gaegyeong, and in 995, the 14th year of Seonjong of Goryeo's reign, it was elevated to "Gaesong-bu". The Gaeseong-bu is a combined term of Song'ak-gun, and Gaesong-gun, which is different from the region of the pre-1945 Gaesong-ri, Seo-myeon, Kaepung-gun. In 1010, the first year of Hyeonjong of Goryeo's reign, the palace and houses were almost burnt down during the second conflict in the Goryeo–Khitan War, so in 1018, Gaesong-bu was relegated for the "bu" system, and became to govern the three hyeon unites of Jeongju, Deoksu, and Gangeum.

In the late 12th century, there was instability in both the government and the countryside. A slave named Manjǒk (or spelled as Manjeok) (만적; 萬積) led a group of slaves who gathered outside Kaesong in 1198. The revolt plot was suppressed by Choe Chung-heon. When Yi Songgye overthrew Goryeo in 1392 and established the Joseon as Taejo of Joseon, he moved the Korean capital from Kaesong to Hanyang (modern-day Seoul) in 1394.

20th century 

Kaesong remained a part of Gyeonggi Province until the Korean War. When Korea was partitioned at the 38th parallel after World War II, Kaesong was on the southern side of the line (within South Korea).

However, the battle of Kaesong-Munsan was won by the Korean People's Army (KPA) in the first days of the Korean War. The city was recaptured by UN Forces on 9 October 1950 during the pursuit of the KPA that followed the successful Inchon landings. UN Forces abandoned the city 16 December 1950 during the withdrawal to the Imjin River following the Chinese People's Volunteer Army intervention in the war. Kaesong would remain under Chinese/North Korean control until the end of the war.

Ceasefire negotiations began in Kaesong on 10 July 1951, but were moved to Panmunjom, southeast of the city, on 25 October 1951. The Korean Armistice Agreement signed on 27 July 1953 recognised North Korean control over Kaesong making it the only city to change control from South Korea to North Korea as a result of the war. Postwar Kaesong and the part of Kyonggi Province that came to be occupied was organized into "Kaesong Region" (Kaesŏng Chigu; 개성 지구; 開城 地區). In 1957, Kaesong became a "Directly Governed City" (Kaesŏng Chikhalsi; 개성 직할시; 開城 直轄市).

21st century 

In 2002, Kaesŏng Industrial Region was formed from part of Kaesong. In 2003, the remaining part of Kaesong (excluding the Industrial Region) became part of North Hwanghae Province. The city is close to the Demilitarized Zone that divides North and South Korea.

In October 2019, Kaesong became a "Special City".

Geography

Located in the center of Korea, Kaesong is the southernmost city of North Korea. It is bordered by Kaepung, Changpung, Panmun, and Kumchon counties. Kanghwa Island of Incheon Municipality lies just south, beyond a narrow channel. It covers an area of 1,309 km2, the urban district is surrounded by Songak (Songak-san; 송악산; 松嶽山) (489 m) and Pongmyong mountains. The city center surrounds the much smaller Mt. Janam (103 m), on which is located the city's Kim Il-sung statue.

In the northern part of Kaesong, the end of the Ahobiryŏng range creates the northernmost border of Kaesong City. This range consists of Mts. Chŏnma (757 m), Sŏnggŏ, Myoji (764 m), Suryong (716 m), Chesŏk (749 m), Hwajang (558 m), and Ogwan. With the exception of the mountainous northeastern region, however, most areas of Kaesong consist of low hills with the height less than 100 meters.

The Imjin River flows along the northeastern border line of the city and the Ryesong River (禮成江) (Ryeseong-gang; 례성강) (transliterated in South Korea as Yeseong-gang; 예성강) runs along the western border to the mouth of the Han River. In addition to the two rivers, small and large rivers and streams such as the Samich'ŏn, Wŏlamch'ŏn, Chukbaech'ŏn, Kŭmsŏngch'ŏn, and Sach'ŏn rivers drain into the Han. The river basin located in the southwest of Kaesong has spacious alluvial plains such as P'ungdŏkbŏl, Singwangbŏl, and Samsŏngbŏl.

The geology consists of the Proterozoic, Cenozoic, and Paleozoic strata and Mesozoic intrusive granite. The underground resources include gold, zinc, copper, fluorspar, limestone, granite, and kaolin. The soil comprises generally brown forest soil while the areas drained by Yesŏng, Imjin, and Han rivers consist of mostly alluvial and saline soil. The climate is generally warm and moderate, with an average annual temperature of around 10 ℃. The coldest month is January, with an average temperature of −5.9 ℃, while the hottest month is August, with an average temperature of 24.7 ℃. The average annual rainfall ranges from 1,300 to 1,400 millimeters. The duration of frost-free period is 180 days—the longest in North Korea. About 55% of Kaesong is forested (80% of the trees are pines), and 40 species of mammals and 250 birds inhabit the area.

Climate
Kaesong has a humid continental climate (Köppen climate classification: Dwa), with cold, dry winters and hot, humid summers with abundant rainfall.

Administrative divisions
Before 2002, Kaesong Directly Governed City was divided into one city (Kaesŏng itself) and three counties; Changpung County, Changpung County and Panmunjom. In 2003, P'anmun-gun and part of Kaesong-si were separated from Kaesŏng Directly Governed City and merged to form Kaesong Industrial Region. The remaining part of Kaesŏng joined North Hwanghae Province in 2002. Kaesong is currently divided into 24 administrative districts known as Dong, as well as three villages ("ri").

 Koryŏ-dong (고려동/):Anhwasa temple is located here.

 Haeun-dong (해운동/):Named after pavillion called Haeunru

 Chanam-dong (자남동/):Named after Mount chanam.

 Kwanhun-dong (관훈동/):The place was named as such because of the fact the place had a Hunryonwon(Institution that hired military officials and soldiers for the Joseon dynasty) and Gwaegwanhyon(also called Gatgoljae, a place where Goryeo scholars protested by refusing to take the Gwageo and take off their gat hats). 

 Manwŏl-dong (만월동/):named after Manwoldae.
 Naesŏng-dong (내성동/):Named after Naeseong of Kaesong city walls

 Nam'an-dong (남안동/):Named as such because it was comfortably in the southern plains of Namdaemun (Kaesong)

 Nammun-dong (남문동/):Named after Namdaemun (Kaesong).Bell of Yonbok Temple is located here.

 Namsan-dong (남산동/)

 Pangjik-tong (방직동/)

 Posŏn-dong (보선동/)

 Pug'an-dong (북안동/):Named as such because it was comfortably in the northern plains of Namdaemun (Kaesong).Kaesong Students and Children's Palace is located here.

 Pusan-dong (부산동/)

 Ryonghŭng-dong (룡흥동/)

 Ryongsan-dong (룡산동/)

 Song'ak-tong (송악동/)

 Sŏngnam-dong (성남동/)

 Sŏnjuk-tong (선죽동/)

 Sŭngjŏn-dong (승전동/)

 Tonghŭng-dong (동흥동/)

 Tonghyŏn-dong (동현동/)

 Ŭndŏk-tong (은덕동/)

 Ŭnhak-tong (운학동/)

 Yŏkchŏn-dong (역전동/)

 Pak'yŏl-li (박연리/)

 Samgŏ-ri (삼거리/)

 Tog'am-ri (덕암리/)

Culture

Landmarks

Kaesong is home to the World Heritage Site Historic Monuments and Sites in Kaesong. Koryo Songgyungwan University (Light Industry), Communist University and Art College are located in Kaesong. The Koryo Museum, housed in the city's old Confucian academy, contains many priceless Goryeo arts and cultural relics (although many are copies, with the originals held in the vaults of the Korean Central History Museum in Pyongyang).

As the former capital of Goryeo, the tombs of almost all of the Goryeo kings are located in the area, though most are not accessible; the heavily reconstructed Tomb of King Wanggon, belonging to the dynasty's founder, Taejo of Goryeo, is located to the west of the city in Kaepung-gun. Other notable tombs include those of kings Hyejong of Goryeo (the Sollung Royal Tomb), Gyeongjong of Goryeo (Yongrung Royal Tomb), Seongjong of Goryeo (Kangrung Royal Tomb), Hyeonjong of Goryeo (Sollung Royal Tomb), Munjong of Goryeo (Kyongrung Royal Tomb), and Gongmin of Goryeo (Tomb of King Kongmin). Kaesong also contains North Korea's only two royal tombs dating to the Joseon: the Hurung Royal Tomb, belonging to the dynasty's second king, Jeongjong of Joseon, and the Cherung Royal Tomb, containing the remains of Queen Sinui, wife of the dynasty's founder, Yi Songgye (Taejo of Joseon). The two final tombs, despite belonging to members of the Joseon royal family, were excluded from the World Heritage Site Royal Tombs of the Joseon Dynasty because of their location in North Korea.

Cuisine

Since Kaesong was the capital of Goryeo with 487 years of rule, its culinary culture was highly developed. The luxurious style of Kaesong cuisine is frequently compared with those of Seoul cuisine and Jeolla cuisine. Kaesong cuisine was traditionally treated as part of Gyeonggi cuisine, since Kaesong belonged to Gyeonggi Province until 1950. However, it has been incorporated into the administration of North Korea after the Korean War while Gyeonggi Province is in South Korea. Bossam kimchi (wrapped kimchi), pyeonsu (square-shaped summer mandu), sinseollo (royal casserole), seolleongtang (ox bone soup), chueotang (mudfish soup), joraengi tteokguk (rice cake soup), umegi (tteok covered with syrup), and gyeongdan (ball-shaped tteok) are representative Kaesong dishes. Umegi, also called Kaesong juak, is a holiday food of Kaesong, and known for the delicate style with the sweet and nutty taste. The dish is made by kneading a mixture of rice flour and glutinous rice flour with warm water, by shaping the dough into balls with either one pine nut or jujube, by frying and coating them with syrup.

Economy

With its topography, climate and soil, Kaesong has advantageous natural conditions for agricultural productions. The water supply system is established with 18 reservoirs, including Songdo Reservoir, built for agricultural advances and about 150 pumping stations as well as hundreds of dammed pools. The cultivated land accounts for 27% of Kaesong's area. Rice, maize, soybeans, wheat, and barley are the main crops. Among them, rice production accounts for 60% of the whole grain production, and Kaepung and Panmun are the two primary regions, producing more than 70% of the rice production. In addition, vegetable and fruit cultivation including peach, apple and persimmon, livestock farming, and sericulture are active. Peach is a local specialty of Kaesong, especially white peach, which accounts for more than 25% of the total fruit production. The counties of Kaepung-gun and Panmun-gun are also known for cultivating the quality Korean ginseng called Goryeo Insam.

Kaesong is North Korea's light industry centre. The urban district is equipped with a jewel processing factory, ginseng processing factory and an embroidery factory. Since the Goryeo period, Kaesong had been a center of handcrafts such as Goryeo ware and commerce while the textile industry has been the primary business along with the production of grocery goods, daily general goods, and ginseng products after the division into the two states. The food processing industry ranks next to the textile business, mainly producing jang (soybean-based condiments), oil, canned foods, alcoholic beverages, soft drinks and others. In addition, resin, timber, handicrafts, pottery, shoes, school supplies, musical instruments, and glass are produced. Kaesong has factories for producing agricultural machines and tractor repair.

As of 2002, the city contained the headquarters of the Central Bank of North Korea, with branches also in Kapung and Panmun counties.

North Korea and South Korea jointly operate an industrial complex in the Kaesong Industrial Region. The industrial park, built around 2005, employs over 53,400 North Koreans at over 120 South Korean textile and other labor-intensive factories. In early 2013, approximately 887 South Koreans worked in the complex, which produced an estimated $470 million of goods in 2012, and the complex employed a sixth of Kaesong's working people.

Amid tensions in 2013, the industrial park was temporarily closed. It was closed again in 2016.

Tourism

Kaesong is a major destination for foreign visitors to North Korea. Many Goryeo-era sites are located in Kaesong, including the Kaesong Namdaemun gate, the Songgyungwan Confucian Academy, now the Koryo Museum, and the Sonjuk Bridge and Pyochung Pavilion. Less-known sites include Kwandok Pavilion, the ruined Goryeo-era Manwoldae Palace, Anhwa Temple, Sungyang Hall, Mokchong Hall, and the Kaesong Chomsongdae (개성 첨성대; 開城 瞻星臺) observatory. Located to the west of the city are the tombs of Kings Kongmin and Wanggon; twenty-four km north of Kaesong is Taehungsan Fortress, a Koguryo satellite fortress built to protect Pyongyang. This castle contains the Kwanum and Taehung Temples. The famous Pakyon Falls are located in the area, as well as a large, recently discovered Goryeo-era Buddha carved into the stone on Mt. Chonma. Most tourists to Kaesong are put in the traditional Kaesong Folk Hotel, housed in 19 traditional hanok courtyard houses.

Education
Sungkyunkwan, one kilometer north of Seonjukgyo bridge is a representative traditional educational institution in Kaesong. It was founded in the neighborhood of Gukja-dong with the name Gukjagam (국자감; 國子監) in 992 during the reign of King Seongjong of Goryeo, which ignited Korean Confucianism. Its name was changed to Gukhak (국학; 國學) in the reign of Chungnyeol of Goryeo and was referred to as Seonggyungwan. In 1367, the 16th year of Gongmin of Goryeo's reign, the structure was revamped and Yi Saek, and Jeong Mong-ju, Confucian scholars of the time taught there as professors. In 1592, the 25th year of Seonjo of Joseon's reign, Kim Yuk reconstructed the institution which was burned down by the Japanese during the Japanese invasions of Korea (1592–1598).

The first modern school that appeared in Kaesong was Hanyeong Seowon (한영서원; 韓英書院), or Anglo-Korean School established by Yun Chi-ho in 1906, with the help of American missionaries Mr. Wasson, and Mr. Candler. It obtained authorization as Songdo High School from Governor-General of Korea in 1917, and expanded to the Songdo School Foundation in 1950 with the accreditation for the establishment of Songdo Middle School and Songdo College of Pharmacy, the latter of which produced 40 graduates. However, when the Korean War occurred, the foundation was moved to Incheon, and reconstructed Songdo Middle and High Schools in 1953 which still exist to the present.

By 1950, there were two public high schools: Kaeseong High School (개성중학교; 開城中學校) and Kaeseong Girls' High School (개성고등여학교; 開城高等女學校) and three private high schools: Songdo High School (송도중학교; 松都中學校), Jeonghwa Girls' School (정화여학교;貞和女學校) and Hosudon Girls' School (호수돈여학교; 好壽敦女學校). Like Songdo High School, Jeonghwa and Hosudon Girls' Schools, with the teachers and most students, evacuated south during the Korean War and their campuses now are located in Seoul and Daejeon respectively.

There were also eight public elementary schools (국민학교) in Kaeseong by 1950, they were the Manwol (만월; 滿月), Donghyun (동현; 銅峴), Seonjuk (선죽; 善竹), Koryo (고려; 高麗), Songdo (송도; 松都), Junggyeong (중경; 中京), Namsan (남산; 南山) and Deokam (덕암; 德岩) elementary schools.

As of 2002, Kaesong had 80 each public elementary schools which scattered in each unit of ri (village), 60 middle-high schools, 3 colleges and 3 universities such as Songdo University of Politics, Kaesong University of Education, and Kaesong Communist University.

Transportation
Kaesong is connected to Pyongyang and other cities by rail and highways. The city's main railway station is Kaesong Station, which is on the Pyongbu Line.

There was a project to build a trolleybus line in this city though never completed.

Sister cities
  Cusco (1990)

People born in Kaesong
 Uicheon (1055–1191), founder of the Cheontae Buddhist sect
 Choe Chung-hon (1149–1219), a military ruler of Korea during the Goryeo
 Choe U (died 1249), general of the Goryeo, son of Choe Chung-Hon
 Hwang Hui (1363–1452), prime minister of Joseon
 Hwang Jin-i (1515–1550), famous Kisaeng and poet
 Lee Jong soo (Chong Lee) (1938–2017), Father of Taekwondo in Canada
 K. W. Lee (1928–), Korean-American print journalist
 Won Pyong Oh (1926–2020), South Korean zoologist
 Chin Byung Ho (1909–1972), Dean of Seoul National University Medical School 
 Youn Yuh-jung (1947-), South Korean actress and Academy Award winner
 Woo In-hee (died 1981), North Korean actress and a mistress of Kim Jong-il.

Notes

References

Citations

Sources 

 .

Further reading
 Dormels, Rainer. North Korea's Cities: Industrial facilities, internal structures and typification. Jimoondang, 2014.

External links 

 Gaeseong Industrial District Foundation Foreign Investment Support Center 
 German website about the City of Kaesong
 " North Korea opens hidden city to tourists." BBC News. Friday 7 December 2007.
 City profile of Kaesong 
 Historical Remains in Kaesong picture album  at Naenara
 Another picture album  at Naenara
 

 
Directly Governed Cities and Special Administrative Regions of North Korea
Former capitals of Korea